Charles Hawkes   was an Anglican priest in Ireland during the late Eighteenth century.

Hawkes was  born at Skekyn  in County Roscommon; and educated at Trinity College, Dublin. He was Archdeacon of Killala  from 1770 until his death in 1788.

Notes

Alumni of Trinity College Dublin
18th-century Irish Anglican priests
1788 deaths
Archdeacons of Killala
People from County Roscommon